Fernand Robache (19 November 1899 – 29 December 1978) was a French racing cyclist. He rode in the 1930 Tour de France.

References

1899 births
1978 deaths
French male cyclists
Place of birth missing